LJS may refer to:

 Long John Silver's restaurant chain
 Liberal Jewish Synagogue, St John's Wood, London